Avishka Chenuka (born 20 April 1999) is a Sri Lankan cricketer. He made his List A debut for Galle Cricket Club in the 2018–19 Premier Limited Overs Tournament on 4 March 2019.

References

External links
 

1999 births
Living people
Sri Lankan cricketers
Galle Cricket Club cricketers
Place of birth missing (living people)